Ryan Dean Shazier (born September 6, 1992) is a former American football linebacker. He played college football at Ohio State and was drafted by the Pittsburgh Steelers in the first round of the 2014 NFL Draft.

Shazier had a successful first few seasons in the league, including a Pro Bowl appearance in 2016. During the 2017 season, in a game against the Cincinnati Bengals, Shazier attempted to make a head-first tackle that left him a paraplegic, after which he had to have spinal stabilization surgery and learn to walk again. After spending two seasons on the Steelers' physically unable to perform list, Shazier announced his retirement from football in 2020.

College career
Shazier initially committed to play for Urban Meyer at Florida but rescinded his commitment after Meyer resigned as the Gators head coach. He then committed to play under Jim Tressel at Ohio State, but Tressel resigned five months later and was eventually replaced with Urban Meyer.

As a true freshman, Shazier played in every regular season contest and started 3 games. His first start came near the end of the season against Penn State, where he recorded 15 tackles. He started the next two games and ended his season with 57 tackles, 5 tackles for a loss, 3 sacks, and 2 forced fumbles.

In 2012, he started all 12 regular season games for Ohio State. Against Penn State, Shazier posted 8 tackles, 2 sacks, and an interception in the third quarter that he returned for the game-deciding touchdown. In a victory against Wisconsin, he had 12 tackles, three tackles for a loss, and he made a game-saving tackle on a goal line stand on fourth and inches. He would finish 2012 leading the Big Ten with 17 tackles for a loss and place second in the league with 115 tackles. Shazier also had 5 sacks and 3 forced fumbles for the season.

Against Indiana in 2013, he posted more than 20 tackles and tied the school record with 16 solo tackles and 5 tackles for loss. He was voted a first-team All-American by the Associated Press, USA Today, ESPN.com, and Sports Illustrated. His 101 solo tackles were the second best in the league and his 143 tackles led the Big Ten Conference. He also had a career-high 6 sacks and 4 forced fumbles.

On January 5, 2014, Shazier announced that he would forgo his senior season and enter the 2014 NFL Draft.

Shazier finished his career at Ohio State with 315 tackles, 208 solo tackles, and 14.5 sacks.

College statistics

Professional career
Coming out of Ohio State, many analysts and scouts projected him as an early-to-mid first round draft selection. He was ranked the third best outside linebacker and the 19th best prospect by NFLDraftScout.com. He was invited to the NFL Combine and was able to perform almost all the workouts and positional drills except for the 40, 20, and 10 yard dash. Shazier also participated at Ohio State's Pro Day and was able to finish the drills he didn't complete at the combine. He received numerous positive reviews for his athleticism, agility, production, flexibility, acceleration, strong hands, and lateral movement. Most negative reviews by analysts were based on his lack of ideal size and his under developed vision, instincts, anticipation, and awareness.

2014
The Pittsburgh Steelers selected Shazier in the first round with the 15th overall pick in the 2014 NFL Draft. He was the third linebacker taken in the draft behind Khalil Mack (5th) and Anthony Barr (9th).

On June 5, 2014, the Pittsburgh Steelers signed Shazier to a fully guaranteed four-year, $9.50 million contract with a signing bonus of $5.23 million.

Shazier began the season as the starting left inside linebacker. He made his professional regular season debut and first career start in the Steelers' home opener against the Cleveland Browns. In his first career game, he made six total tackles (five solo) and a pass deflection. The following week against the Baltimore Ravens, he had 15 total tackles, with 11 of them being solo, in a 6–20 loss. Shazier missed weeks 4–7 of his rookie season with a knee injury. He returned for his first game back from his injury on October 26, 2014, against the Indianapolis Colts. He finished the game with four tackles (two solo tackles). After playing two games, Shazier then injured his ankle and missed another four games. After returning, Shazier made six combined tackles in a 27–17 victory over the Cincinnati Bengals on December 24. Following an 11–5 season the Steelers made the playoffs. In his first career playoff game, Shazier made 3 solo tackles and one assist in a 17–30 wild-card loss to the Baltimore Ravens. In his first season, he finished with a total of 36 tackles, 24 solo tackles, and a pass deflection in five starts and eight games.

2015
After his rookie season, Shazier returned the next season to again be the starting inside linebacker. On September 10, 2015, Shazier made five solo tackles and two assists in the season opener at the New England Patriots. The next game against the San Francisco 49ers, he left the game with a shoulder injury in the fourth quarter after making a career-high 15 total tackles and 11 solo tackles. He also sacked 49ers quarterback Colin Kaepernick for his first career sack. Shazier missed weeks 3–6 with nerve damage in his shoulder. After returning, he made five solo tackles, one assist, and a sack in a Week 10 win over the Cleveland Browns. On November 29, 2015, he sustained a concussion and left in the fourth quarter against the Seattle Seahawks. On December 20, 2015, Shazier made three solo tackles, three assists, and three pass deflections in a 34–27 win over the Denver Broncos. He also made his first career interception, after picking off Broncos quarterback Brock Osweiler. On January 9, 2016, during the AFC wild card game against the Cincinnati Bengals, Shazier stripped the ball from Jeremy Hill with 1:36 left in the fourth quarter. The ball was recovered by Ross Cockrell, leading to the game-winning field goal from Chris Boswell. Shazier finished the 18–16 victory with nine combined tackles and two forced fumbles. He finished the season with 87 combined tackles, 3 sacks, and an interception in 12 starts and 12 games.

2016
Shazier returned to his starting inside linebacker role to begin the 2016 season. He started the Steelers' season-opener against the Washington Redskins and made six combined tackles, two pass deflections, a forced fumble, and intercepted Kirk Cousins as the Steelers routed the Redskins 38–16. The next game, Shazier recorded a season-high 12 combined tackles in a 24–16 victory over the Cincinnati Bengals. He re-injured his knee the following game against the Philadelphia Eagles and was inactive from Weeks 4–6. He made his return in a Week 7 matchup against the New England Patriots and was limited to two assisted tackles and a pass deflection in the 27–16 loss. On November 20, 2016, Shazier racked up seven total tackles, a pass deflection, and sacked Josh McCown for his first of the season, as the Steelers defeated the Cleveland Browns 24–9. On December 25, 2016, he recorded ten combined tackles and intercepted Joe Flacco in a 31–27 playoff clinching victory over the Baltimore Ravens. The next game, Shazier made eight combined tackles and intercepted Robert Griffin III in a 27–24 win over the Browns on their season finale.

He finished the regular season with 87 combined tackles, 9 pass deflections, 3 sacks, and 3 interceptions in 12 starts and 13 games. On January 8, 2017, Shazier recorded six combined tackles and intercepted Matt Moore, as the Pittsburgh Steelers defeated the Miami Dolphins in the AFC Wildcard game 30–12. On January 15, 2017, he recorded 5 combined tackles and intercepted Alex Smith in the Steelers' 18–16 Divisional Round victory over the Kansas City Chiefs.

2017
On April 24, 2017, the Steelers picked up the fifth-year option on Shazier's contract.

On September 10, 2017, Shazier had one of the best statistical games of his career, tying a career-high with 11 solo tackles and forcing a career-high of two forced fumbles during a 21–18 victory over the Cleveland Browns.

Spinal injury
During a Monday Night Football game against the Cincinnati Bengals on December 4, 2017, Shazier sustained what appeared to be a severe back injury after a head-on tackle. The hit left Shazier seemingly unable to move his legs. After stabilization he was taken to the hospital and the next morning revealed that he had sustained a spinal contusion. On December 7, Shazier underwent spinal stabilization surgery to secure the injured section of spine and to aid in his recovery. The surgery ended his 2017 season. But despite the injury, Shazier was named to his second Pro Bowl on December 19, 2017. He was ranked 47th by his peers on the NFL Top 100 Players of 2018.

On February 28, 2018, Steelers GM Kevin Colbert announced that Shazier would not be able to play during the 2018 season. On April 26, 2018, Shazier walked onto the AT&T Stadium stage with his fiancée, Michelle Rodriguez, to announce the 28th pick of the NFL draft, Terrell Edmunds. On May 2, the Steelers placed Shazier on the reserve/PUP list, ending his 2018 season. On November 30, 2018, Shazier jogged for the first time since his spinal stabilization surgery, according to Steelers linebacker coach Joey Porter. On April 29, 2019, the Steelers placed Shazier on the reserve/PUP list, ending his 2019 season. The Steelers placed Shazier on the reserve/retired list on March 17, 2020, effectively ending his playing career. On September 9, 2020, Shazier announced his retirement from the NFL.

NFL career statistics

Personal life
Shazier has alopecia, an autoimmune condition which prevents the growth of hair on the body. Throughout his childhood, he was the subject of ridicule and taunting because of this. However, with support and encouragement from his parents, Shazier developed an altruistic temperament to deal with the jabs and name calling.  In May 2017, he wrote of his experiences when his hair unexpectedly began growing back.
 
On May 3, 2019, Shazier married Michelle Rodriguez. Seventeen months after suffering a spinal injury that doctors feared would leave him paralyzed, Shazier was able to dance at his wedding. Shazier has a son from a previous relationship named Ryan Dean Shazier Jr., and another son born in January 2019 to him and Rodriguez.

In the fall of 2019, Shazier returned to college, and graduated in December 2020 at his alma mater, Ohio State University.

In January 2023, Shazier partnered with the cannabis company Organic Remedies to launch a line of cannabis products named Steel City Greats. Shazier says that while recovering from his spinal injury, he was seeking a "safe, natural alternative to opioid pain medications" and that cannabis provided him with a "restorative healing that allowed [him] to manage the pain through a difficult time in [his] life".

References

External links
Pittsburgh Steelers bio
Ohio State Buckeyes bio

1992 births
Living people
American Conference Pro Bowl players
American football linebackers
Businesspeople in the cannabis industry
Ed Block Courage Award recipients
Ohio State Buckeyes football players
People from Lauderdale Lakes, Florida
People from Plantation, Florida
People from Pompano Beach, Florida
Pittsburgh Steelers players
Shazier, Ryan
Players of American football from Florida
Sportspeople from Broward County, Florida